Lancien is a surname. Notable people with the surname include: 

Frédéric Lancien (born 1971), French cyclist
Jack Lancien (1923–1991), Canadian ice hockey player
Nathalie Lancien (born 1970), French racing cyclist
Noël Lancien (1934–1999), French composer, conductor, and music educator